Lithoseopsis is a genus of tropical barklice in the family Amphientomidae. There are about 10 described species in Lithoseopsis.

Species
These 10 species belong to the genus Lithoseopsis:
 Lithoseopsis brasiliensis Garcia Aldrete, Da Silva-Neto & Lopes Ferreira, 2018
 Lithoseopsis cervantesi Garcia Aldrete, 2003
 Lithoseopsis chamelensis Garcia Aldrete, 2003
 Lithoseopsis hellmani (Mockford & Gurney, 1956)
 Lithoseopsis humphreysi (New, 1994)
 Lithoseopsis hystrix (Mockford, 1974)
 Lithoseopsis incisa (Smithers, 1989)
 Lithoseopsis insularis Garcia Aldrete, 2003
 Lithoseopsis tuitensis Garcia Aldrete, 2003
 † Lithoseopsis elongata (Mockford, 1969)

References

Troctomorpha
Articles created by Qbugbot